"December" is a song by American alternative rock band Collective Soul, released on the band's 1995 eponymous album. Written by singer/guitarist Ed Roland, it peaked at number 20 on the Billboard Hot 100 and number one on the Billboard Album Rock Tracks chart for nine weeks. It also reached number two on the Billboard Modern Rock Tracks chart, making it their highest-ranking single on that listing. In Canada, the song peaked at number two on the RPM 100 Hit Tracks chart, becoming their highest-charting single until "The World I Know" attained the top spot in March 1996.

Composition
In a December 2017 interview with Songfacts, lead singer Ed Roland explained the inspiration behind "December":

Track listings
US 7-inch single
A. "December" – 4:09
B. "Gel" – 2:59

US cassette single
 "December" (edit)
 "Where the River Flows" (LP version)

German and Australian CD single
 "December" (LP version)
 "Sister Don't Cry" (acoustic)
 "Where the River Flows" (live)
 "December" (live)
 All live tracks were recorded on March 14, 1995, at The Thunderdome (St. Petersburg, Florida)

Charts

Weekly charts

Year-end charts

Cover version
Burmese rock band Iron Cross has "copied" the song live in concert.

References

1994 songs
1995 singles
Atlantic Records singles
Collective Soul songs
Song recordings produced by Matt Serletic
Songs written by Ed Roland